Bryan Michael Stoller (born 1960) is a Canadian independent filmmaker whose films include “First Dog,” “The Amazing Wizard of Paws,” “Santa Stole Our Dog,“ (Universal) Turn of the Blade, The Random Factor, Miss Cast Away, Undercover Angel, and Light Years Away.

His childhood hobbies included magic tricks and clay animation. His dad attempted to convince Bryan to pursue a different career; later, his dad said he was proud of Stoller's career. As a teen, he earned multiple Film Awards: a gold award in "Film Magic" at The Festival of the Americas (1978), a bronze medal at the Miami International Film Festival for a super documentary (1979), and Best Youth Film at the Canadian International Amateur Film Festival (1979). When Bryan was twelve years old he hosted a national children's show on the CBC (Canadian Broadcasting Company) called "Film Fun" showing pre-teens how to make their own super-8 movies.

After producing commercials for local businesses, he moved to Los Angeles at 19 to direct at the American Film Institute and earned a role dusting the actors on The Incredible Hulk TV series when they destroyed a wall.

Stoller said he prefers directing to producing because he enjoys the creative aspect. He has also acted briefly, making a few cameos in his productions and starring in a short "A Canadian Werewolf in Hollywood", a parody of American Werewolf in London where he transforms into a werewolf in the middle of a call and uses his wolf side to produce a film. "A Canadian Werewolf in Hollywood" and other spoofs Stoller directed were packaged into a movie called Undershorts: The Movie.

Other shorts in Undershorts: The Movie  received attention from celebrities parodied by them. "The Incredible Bulk", a parody of The Incredible Hulk TV series, included Lou Ferrigno from the TV show reprising his role as the Hulk. "The Shadow of Michael", a parody of a Pepsi commercial starring Michael Jackson caught Jackson's attention, and Jackson reprised his minor character Agent MJ from Men in Black II for Stoller's short titled "Agent MJ" and movie Miss Cast Away.

Jackson and Stoller were planning to release a new movie called They Cage the Animals at Night prior to Jackson's death. Jackson's estate said there was no formal deal for the movie, as Jackson didn't have a management team at the time he discussed the movie—though there was a contractual agreement drafted and signed through Jackson's attorneys. Stoller was interviewed after Jackson's death to talk about his friendship. Stoller noted that Jackson seemed frail prior to his death and said he didn't believe allegations against Jackson.

Stoller adopted a dog named Little Bear. The dog was previously fostered by former president Ronald Reagan and first lady Nancy Reagan. Stoller met Nancy Reagan, which inspired him to create the movie First Dog starring Little Bear as a 600-year-old dog.

Stoller has also coached filmmakers and actors and written the coaching books Filmmaking for Dummies and Harry Potter: Imagining Hogwarts.  Stoller has accomplished a feat that most independent filmmakers have not achieved;  his movie "UnderCover Angel" and "Wizard of Paws" amassed close to eighteen million views on AVOD without any advertising—word of mouth only.

Selected filmography

Films

Television

Bibliography
Stoller, Bryan Michael, Filmmaking for Dummies (2003) ”
"Smartphone Moviemaking"
"Harry Potter: Imagining Hogwarts" a guide to movie making.

References

External links
Official site

Living people
Canadian male screenwriters
Film producers from Ontario
Film directors from Ontario
Writers from Ontario
People from Peterborough, Ontario
1960 births
20th-century Canadian screenwriters
20th-century Canadian male writers
21st-century Canadian screenwriters
21st-century Canadian male writers